The 22nd FAI European Hot Air Balloon Championship was held from 13 to 17 September 2021 in Szeged, Hungary. Happened exactly 210 years ago, on June 3rd, 1811, that the first hot air balloon flew in Hungary for the first time. It was the first time that an Armenian hot air balloon pilot participated at a European Championship.

Results 
Source:

Nation Ranking 
Source:

References

External links 
 Official Website

Ballooning competitions
September 2021 sports events in Europe
2021 in Hungary
Sport in Szeged
2021 in Hungarian sport
2021 in air sports